The Democratic Jihad Party was an Egyptian political party made up of former members of the group Egyptian Islamic Jihad; it was also made up of members of other "former jihadist groups". The party is also known as the Islamic Democratic Jihad Party, as well as the Islamist Jihadi Party. A member of the party has stated that the party has "failed". The party has stated that it supported Ahmed Shafiq in the 2012 presidential election; Sabra Ibrahim, a deputy founder in the party, stated that the party gave its support to Shafiq in order to prevent the establishment of a theocratic state ruled by the Muslim Brotherhood. The party condemned the attack in August 2012 that killed 16 soldiers, saying that it was committed by “sinful terrorist[s].” Yasser Saad is now a member of an umbrella coalition of former jihadis, ex-members of the Muslim Brotherhood and ex-al-Gama'a al-Islamiyya members called the Moderate Front.

Policy 
Sheikh Yasser Saad, the leader of the party, has stated that the party will be inclusive regarding minorities. A young female party member named Hanan Nouredin appeared unveiled at the press conference announcing the plan to found the party.

Criticism 
The party was criticized by Muhammad al-Zawahiri for embracing democracy.

See also 
 Islamic Party, another political party founded by former Egyptian Islamic Jihad members

References

2012 establishments in Egypt
Centrist parties in Egypt
Defunct political parties in Egypt
Islamic political parties in Egypt
Political parties established in 2012